Elections to Ballymoney Borough Council were held on 5 May 2005 on the same day as the other Northern Irish local government elections. The election used three district electoral areas to elect a total of 16 councillors.

Election results

Note: "Votes" are the first preference votes.

Districts summary

|- class="unsortable" align="centre"
!rowspan=2 align="left"|Ward
! % 
!Cllrs
! % 
!Cllrs
! %
!Cllrs
! %
!Cllrs
! % 
!Cllrs
!rowspan=2|TotalCllrs
|- class="unsortable" align="center"
!colspan=2 bgcolor="" | DUP
!colspan=2 bgcolor="" | Sinn Féin
!colspan=2 bgcolor="" | UUP
!colspan=2 bgcolor="" | SDLP
!colspan=2 bgcolor="white"| Others
|-
|align="left"|Ballymoney Town
|bgcolor="#D46A4C"|67.8
|bgcolor="#D46A4C"|3
|0.0
|0
|19.2
|2
|13.0
|0
|0.0
|0
|5
|-
|align="left"|Bann Valley
|bgcolor="#D46A4C"|43.3
|bgcolor="#D46A4C"|3
|33.7
|2
|12.4
|0
|10.6
|1
|0.0
|0
|6
|-
|align="left"|Bushvale
|bgcolor="#D46A4C"|38.6
|bgcolor="#D46A4C"|2
|19.6
|1
|14.9
|0
|13.9
|1
|13.0
|1
|5
|-'
|-
|- class="unsortable" class="sortbottom" style="background:#C9C9C9"
|align="left"| Total
|48.9
|8
|20.0
|3
|15.1
|2
|12.3
|2
|3.7
|1
|16
|-
|}

Districts results

Ballymoney Town

2001: 3 x DUP, 2 x UUP
2005: 3 x DUP, 2 x UUP
2001-2005 Change: No change

Bann Valley

2001: 3 x DUP, 1 x Sinn Féin, 1 x SDLP, 1 x UUP
2005: 3 x DUP, 2 x Sinn Féin, 1 x SDLP
2001-2005 Change: Sinn Féin gain from UUP

Bushvale

2001: 2 x DUP, 2 x UUP, 1 x SDLP
2005: 2 x DUP, 1 x Sinn Féin, 1 x SDLP, 1 x Independent
2001-2005 Change: Sinn Féin and DUP gain from UUP (two seats), Independent leaves DUP

References

Ballymoney Borough Council elections
Ballymoney